In mathematics, Steinberg group means either of two distinct, though related, constructions of the mathematician Robert Steinberg: 

Steinberg group (K-theory) St(A) in algebraic K-theory.
Steinberg group (Lie theory) is a 'twisted' group of Lie type, in particular one of the groups of type 3D4 or 2E6.